Michael Maurice Pennel Jr. (born May 9, 1991) is an American football nose tackle who is a free agent. He played college football at Scottsdale Community College, Arizona State, and CSU-Pueblo and was signed by the Green Bay Packers as an undrafted free agent in 2014.

College career
Pennel played college football at Scottsdale Community College, Arizona State University and Colorado State University Pueblo. He was suspended indefinitely by Arizona State in 2012 for comments he made over Twitter and transferred to Colorado State University Pueblo.

Professional career

Green Bay Packers
After going undrafted in the 2014 NFL Draft, Pennel signed with the Green Bay Packers on May 12, 2014. Pennel joined Jayrone Elliott as undrafted players to make the Packers roster. During his rookie season in 2014, Pennel made 13 game appearances with 8 tackles. In 2015, Pennel appeared in all 16 games, starting 5 of them with 24 tackles, one sack, and one forced fumble.

On February 19, 2016, Pennel was suspended for the first four games of the 2016 season due to violating the league's substance abuse policy. Pennel was then suspended for the final four games of the 2016 season for again violating the league's substance abuse policy. In eight games of 2016, Pennel finished with seven tackles and a pass defended.

On January 9, 2017, Pennel was released by the Packers.

New York Jets
On February 6, 2017, Pennel was claimed off waivers by the New York Jets. He re-signed with the Jets on March 16, 2017. He played in all 16 games in 2017, recording a career-high 35 tackles.

On March 16, 2018, Pennel signed a three-year contract with the Jets.

On February 19, 2019, the Jets declined the option on Pennel's contract, making him a free agent at the start of the new league year.

New England Patriots
On March 14, 2019, Pennel signed a two-year contract with the New England Patriots. On August 26, 2019, Pennel was released by the Patriots.

Kansas City Chiefs
On October 19, 2019, the Kansas City Chiefs signed Pennel.

On January 19, 2020, Pennel helped the Chiefs reach the Super Bowl after helping defeat the Tennessee Titans in the AFC Championship Game. In Super Bowl LIV, Pennel recorded one tackle in the Chiefs 31–20 victory against the San Francisco 49ers.

On April 6, 2020, Pennel was re-signed to a one-year contract. He was suspended for the first two games of the 2020 season on August 25, 2020. He was reinstated from suspension and activated to the roster on September 23, 2020.

Chicago Bears
On June 18, 2021, Pennel signed a one-year deal with the Chicago Bears. He was placed on injured reserve on August 24, 2021. He was released on August 31.

Atlanta Falcons
On September 15, 2021, Pennel was signed to the Atlanta Falcons practice squad. On October 5, 2021, Pennel was promoted to the Falcons active roster.

Chicago Bears (second stint)
Pennel signed with the Chicago Bears on June 13, 2022. He was released on September 9, and re-signed to the practice squad. He was promoted to the active roster on September 12. Pennel appeared in all 17 games for the Bears, where he recorded 26 total tackles and one forced fumble. He was ejected from the team’s Week 6 contest against the New England Patriots for delivering a blind-sided block that concussed center David Andrews.

Statistics
Source: NFL.com

References

External links
 Kansas City Chiefs bio
 Green Bay Packers bio
 CSU–Pueblo ThunderWolves bio
 Arizona State Sun Devils bio
 
 Never Was a Plan B

1991 births
Living people
Players of American football from Kansas
Sportspeople from Topeka, Kansas
Players of American football from Colorado
Sportspeople from Aurora, Colorado
American football defensive tackles
Scottsdale Fighting Artichokes football players
Arizona State Sun Devils football players
CSU Pueblo ThunderWolves football players
Green Bay Packers players
Kansas City Chiefs players
New York Jets players
New England Patriots players
Chicago Bears players
Atlanta Falcons players